Marcello Mascherini (14 September 1906 in Udine - 19 Februar 1983 in Padua) was an Italian sculptor. His sculptures were exhibited in many places including several editions of the Venice Biennale

Selected works
 San Francesco (1956) in Palazzo Massari
 St. Francis (1957) in Middelheim Open Air Sculpture Museum

References

External links

1906 births
1983 deaths
People from Udine
Italian male sculptors
20th-century sculptors